The Atwood machine (or Atwood's machine) was invented in 1784 by the English mathematician George Atwood as a laboratory experiment to verify the mechanical laws of motion with constant acceleration. Atwood's machine is a common classroom demonstration used to illustrate principles of classical mechanics.

Both masses experience uniform acceleration. When , the machine is in neutral equilibrium regardless of the position of the weights.

Equation for constant acceleration 

An equation for the acceleration can be derived by analyzing forces.
Assuming a massless, inextensible string and an ideal massless pulley, the only forces to consider are: tension force, and the weight of the two masses ( and ). To find an acceleration, consider the forces affecting each individual mass. 
Using Newton's second law (with a sign convention of  derive a system of equations for the acceleration.

Forces affecting m1: 
Forces affecting m2: 
and adding the two previous equations yields 
and the concluding formula for acceleration 

The Atwood machine is sometimes used to illustrate the Lagrangian method of deriving equations of motion.

Equation for tension 
It can be useful to know an equation for the tension in the string. To evaluate tension, substitute the equation for acceleration in either of the two force equations.

For example, substituting into , results in
where  is the harmonic mean of the two masses.

Equations for a pulley with inertia and friction 
The angular acceleration of the pulley is given by the no-slip condition:

where  is the angular acceleration. The net torque is then:

Acceleration:

Tension in string segment nearest :

Tension in string segment nearest :

Should bearing friction be negligible (but not the inertia of the pulley nor the traction of the string on the pulley rim), these equations simplify as the following results:

Acceleration: 

Tension in string segment nearest :

Tension in string segment nearest :

Practical implementations 

Atwood's original illustrations show the main pulley's axle resting on the rims of another four wheels, to minimize friction forces from the bearings. Many historical implementations of the machine follow this design.

An elevator with a counterbalance approximates an ideal Atwood machine and thereby relieves the driving motor from the load of holding the elevator cab — it has to overcome only weight difference and inertia of the two masses. The same principle is used for funicular railways with two connected railway cars on inclined tracks, and for the elevators on the Eiffel Tower which counterbalance each other.  Ski lifts are another example, where the gondolas move on a closed (continuous) pulley system up and down the mountain.  The ski lift is similar to the counter-weighted elevator, but with a constraining force provided by the cable in the vertical dimension thereby achieving work in both the horizontal and vertical dimensions. Boat lifts are another type of counter-weighted elevator system approximating an Atwood machine.

See also
Frictionless plane
Kater's pendulum
Spherical cow
Swinging Atwood's machine

Notes

External links

A treatise on the rectilinear motion and rotation of bodies; with a description of original experiments relative to the subject by George Atwood, 1764.  Drawings appear on page 450.
Professor Greenslade's account on the Atwood Machine
Atwood's Machine by Enrique Zeleny, The Wolfram Demonstrations Project

Mechanics
Physics experiments